Jacques Legrand may refer to:

 Jacques Legrand (philatelist) (1820–1912), French philatelist
 Jacques Legrand (resistance leader), French Resistance leader
 Jacques Legrand (Mongolist) (born 1946), French linguist and anthropologist